A printing press is a mechanical device for applying pressure to an inked surface resting upon a print medium (such as paper or cloth), thereby transferring the ink. It marked a dramatic improvement on earlier printing methods in which the cloth, paper or other medium was brushed or rubbed repeatedly to achieve the transfer of ink, and accelerated the process. Typically used for texts, the invention and global spread of the printing press was one of the most influential events in the second millennium.

In Germany, around 1440, goldsmith Johannes Gutenberg invented the movable-type printing press, which started the Printing Revolution. Modelled on the design of existing screw presses, a single Renaissance movable-type printing press could produce up to 3,600 pages per workday, compared to forty by hand-printing and a few by hand-copying. Gutenberg's newly devised hand mould made possible the precise and rapid creation of metal movable type in large quantities. His two inventions, the hand mould and the movable-type printing press, together drastically reduced the cost of printing books and other documents in Europe, particularly for shorter print runs.

From Mainz the movable-type printing press spread within several decades to over two hundred cities in a dozen European countries. By 1500, printing presses in operation throughout Western Europe had already produced more than twenty million volumes. In the 16th century, with presses spreading further afield, their output rose tenfold to an estimated 150 to 200 million copies. By the mid-17th century the first printing presses arrived in colonial America in response to the increasing demand for Bibles and other religious literature. The operation of a press became synonymous with the enterprise of printing, and lent its name to a new medium of expression and communication, "the press".

The arrival of mechanical movable type printing in Europe in the Renaissance introduced the era of mass communication, which permanently altered the structure of society. The relatively unrestricted circulation of information and (revolutionary) ideas transcended borders, captured the masses in the Reformation and threatened the power of political and religious authorities. The sharp increase in literacy broke the monopoly of the literate elite on education and learning and bolstered the emerging middle class. Across Europe, the increasing cultural self-awareness of its peoples led to the rise of proto-nationalism, and accelerated the development of European vernaculars, to the detriment of Latin's status as lingua franca. In the 19th century, the replacement of the hand-operated Gutenberg-style press by steam-powered rotary presses allowed printing on an industrial scale.

History

Economic conditions and intellectual climate 

The rapid economic and socio-cultural development of late medieval society in Europe created favorable intellectual and technological conditions for Gutenberg's improved version of the printing press: the entrepreneurial spirit of emerging capitalism increasingly made its impact on medieval modes of production, fostering economic thinking and improving the efficiency of traditional work processes. The sharp rise of medieval learning and literacy amongst the middle class led to an increased demand for books which the time-consuming hand-copying method fell far short of accommodating.

Technological factors 

Technologies preceding the press that led to the press's invention included: manufacturing of paper, development of ink, woodblock printing, and distribution of eyeglasses. At the same time, a number of medieval products and technological processes had reached a level of maturity which allowed their potential use for printing purposes. Gutenberg took up these far-flung strands, combined them into one complete and functioning system, and perfected the printing process through all its stages by adding a number of inventions and innovations of his own:

The screw press which allowed direct pressure to be applied on a flat plane was already of great antiquity in Gutenberg's time and was used for a wide range of tasks. Introduced in the 1st century AD by the Romans, it was commonly employed in agricultural production for pressing wine grapes and olives (for olive oil), both of which formed an integral part of the Mediterranean and medieval diet. The device was also used from very early on in urban contexts as a cloth press for printing patterns. Gutenberg may have also been inspired by the paper presses which had spread through the German lands since the late 14th century and which worked on the same mechanical principles.

During the Islamic Golden Age, Arab Muslims were printing texts, including passages from the Qur’an, embracing the Chinese craft of paper making, developed it and adopted it widely in the Muslim world, which led to a major increase in the production of manuscript texts. In Egypt during the Fatimid era, the printing technique was adopted reproducing texts on paper strips by hand and supplying them in various copies to meet the demand.

Gutenberg adopted the basic design, thereby mechanizing the printing process. Printing, however, put a demand on the machine quite different from pressing. Gutenberg adapted the construction so that the pressing power exerted by the platen on the paper was now applied both evenly and with the required sudden elasticity. To speed up the printing process, he introduced a movable undertable with a plane surface on which the sheets could be swiftly changed.

The concept of movable type existed prior to 15th century Europe; sporadic evidence that the typographical principle, the idea of creating a text by reusing individual characters, was known and had been cropping up since the 12th century and possibly before (the oldest known application dating back as far as the Phaistos disc). The known examples range from movable type printing in China during the Song dynasty; in Korea during the Goryeo Dynasty, where metal movable-type printing technology was developed in 1234; to Germany (Prüfening inscription) and England (letter tiles) and Italy (Altarpiece of Pellegrino II). However, the various techniques employed (imprinting, punching and assembling individual letters) did not have the refinement and efficiency needed to become widely accepted. Tsuen-Hsuin and Needham, and Briggs and Burke suggest that the movable-type printing in China and Korea was rarely employed.

Gutenberg greatly improved the process by treating typesetting and printing as two separate work steps. A goldsmith by profession, he created his type pieces from a lead-based alloy which suited printing purposes so well that it is still used today. The mass production of metal letters was achieved by his key invention of a special hand mould, the matrix. The Latin alphabet proved to be an enormous advantage in the process because, in contrast to logographic writing systems, it allowed the type-setter to represent any text with a theoretical minimum of only around two dozen different letters.

Another factor conducive to printing arose from the book existing in the format of the codex, which had originated in the Roman period. Considered the most important advance in the history of the book prior to printing itself, the codex had completely replaced the ancient scroll at the onset of the Middle Ages (AD500). The codex holds considerable practical advantages over the scroll format: it is more convenient to read (by turning pages), more compact, and less costly, and both recto and verso sides could be used for writing or printing, unlike the scroll.

A fourth development was the early success of medieval papermakers at mechanizing paper manufacture. The introduction of water-powered paper mills, the first certain evidence of which dates to 1282, allowed for a massive expansion of production and replaced the laborious handcraft characteristic of both Chinese and Muslim papermaking. Papermaking centres began to multiply in the late 13th century in Italy, reducing the price of paper to one-sixth of parchment and then falling further; papermaking centers reached Germany a century later.

Despite this it appears that the final breakthrough of paper depended just as much on the rapid spread of movable-type printing. It is notable that codices of parchment, which in terms of quality is superior to any other writing material, still had a substantial share in Gutenberg's edition of the 42-line Bible. After much experimentation, Gutenberg managed to overcome the difficulties which traditional water-based inks caused by soaking the paper, and found the formula for an oil-based ink suitable for high-quality printing with metal type.

Function and approach 

The small individual metal letters known as type would be set up by a compositor into the desired lines of text. Several lines of text would be arranged at once and were placed in a wooden frame known as a galley. Once the correct number of pages were composed, the galleys would be laid face up in a frame, also known as a forme, which itself is placed onto a flat stone, 'bed,' or 'coffin.' The text is inked using two balls, pads mounted on handles. The balls were made of dog skin leather, because it has no pores, and stuffed with sheep's wool and were inked. This ink was then applied to the text evenly. One damp piece of paper was then taken from a heap of paper and placed on the tympan. The paper was damp as this lets the type 'bite' into the paper better. Small pins hold the paper in place. The paper is now held between a frisket and tympan (two frames covered with paper or parchment).

These are folded down, so that the paper lies on the surface of the inked type. The bed is rolled under the platen, using a windlass mechanism. A small rotating handle called the 'rounce' is used to do this, and the impression is made with a screw that transmits pressure through the platen. To turn the screw the long handle attached to it is turned. This is known as the bar or 'Devil's Tail.' In a well-set-up press, the springiness of the paper, frisket, and tympan caused the bar to spring back and raise the platen, the windlass turned again to move the bed back to its original position, the tympan and frisket raised and opened, and the printed sheet removed. Such presses were always worked by hand. After around 1800, iron presses were developed, some of which could be operated by steam power.

The function of the press in the image on the left was described by William Skeen in 1872,

Gutenberg's press 

Johannes Gutenberg's work on the printing press began in approximately 1436 when he partnered with Andreas Dritzehn—a man who had previously instructed in gem-cutting—and Andreas Heilmann, owner of a paper mill. However, it was not until a 1439 lawsuit against Gutenberg that an official record existed; witnesses' testimony discussed Gutenberg's types, an inventory of metals (including lead), and his type molds.

Having previously worked as a professional goldsmith, Gutenberg made skillful use of the knowledge of metals he had learned as a craftsman. He was the first to make type from an alloy of lead, tin, and antimony, which was critical for producing durable type that produced high-quality printed books and proved to be much better suited for printing than all other known materials. To create these lead types, Gutenberg used what is considered one of his most ingenious inventions, a special matrix enabling the quick and precise molding of new type blocks from a uniform template. His type case is estimated to have contained around 290 separate letter boxes, most of which were required for special characters, ligatures, punctuation marks, and so forth.

Gutenberg is also credited with the introduction of an oil-based ink which was more durable than the previously used water-based inks. As printing material he used both paper and vellum (high-quality parchment). In the Gutenberg Bible, Gutenberg made a trial of colour printing for a few of the page headings, present only in some copies. A later work, the Mainz Psalter of 1453, presumably designed by Gutenberg but published under the imprint of his successors Johann Fust and Peter Schöffer, had elaborate red and blue printed initials.

The Printing Revolution 

The Printing Revolution occurred when the spread of the printing press facilitated the wide circulation of information and ideas, acting as an "agent of change" through the societies that it reached.  The need for bibles and other religious literature, especially in the new world, was one of the principle factors that brought printing into the common world. Printing presses also played a major role in rallying support, and opposition, during the American and French Revolutions through newspapers, pamphlets and bulletins. The advent of the printing press brought with it issues involving censorship and freedom of the press.

Mass production and spread of printed books 

The invention of mechanical movable type printing led to a huge increase of printing activities across Europe within only a few decades. From a single print shop in Mainz, Germany, printing had spread to no less than around 270 cities in Central, Western and Eastern Europe by the end of the 15th century. As early as 1480, there were printers active in 110 different places in Germany, Italy, France, Spain, the Netherlands, Belgium, Switzerland, England, Bohemia and Poland. From that time on, it is assumed that "the printed book was in universal use in Europe".

In Italy, a center of early printing, print shops had been established in 77 cities and towns by 1500. At the end of the following century, 151 locations in Italy had seen at one time printing activities, with a total of nearly three thousand printers known to be active. Despite this proliferation, printing centres soon emerged; thus, one third of the Italian printers published in Venice.

By 1500, the printing presses in operation throughout Western Europe had already produced more than twenty million copies. In the following century, their output rose tenfold to an estimated 150 to 200 million copies.

European printing presses of around 1600 were capable of producing between 1,500 and 3,600 impressions per workday. By comparison, Far Eastern printing, where the back of the paper was manually rubbed to the page, did not exceed an output of forty pages per day.

Of Erasmus's work, at least 750,000 copies were sold during his lifetime alone (1469–1536). In the early days of the Reformation, the revolutionary potential of bulk printing took princes and papacy alike by surprise. In the period from 1518 to 1524, the publication of books in Germany alone skyrocketed sevenfold; between 1518 and 1520, Luther's tracts were distributed in 300,000 printed copies.

The rapidity of typographical text production, as well as the sharp fall in unit costs, led to the issuing of the first newspapers (see Relation) which opened up an entirely new field for conveying up-to-date information to the public.

Incunable are surviving pre-16th century print works which are collected by many of the libraries in Europe and North America.

Circulation of information and ideas 

The printing press was also a factor in the establishment of a community of scientists who could easily communicate their discoveries through the establishment of widely disseminated scholarly journals, helping to bring on the scientific revolution. Because of the printing press, authorship became more meaningful and profitable. It was suddenly important who had said or written what, and what the precise formulation and time of composition was. This allowed the exact citing of references, producing the rule, "One Author, one work (title), one piece of information" (Giesecke, 1989; 325). Before, the author was less important, since a copy of Aristotle made in Paris would not be exactly identical to one made in Bologna. For many works prior to the printing press, the name of the author has been entirely lost.

Because the printing process ensured that the same information fell on the same pages, page numbering, tables of contents, and indices became common, though they previously had not been unknown. The process of reading also changed, gradually moving over several centuries from oral readings to silent, private reading. Over the next 200 years, the wider availability of printed materials led to a dramatic rise in the adult literacy rate throughout Europe.

The printing press was an important step towards the democratization of knowledge. Within 50 or 60 years of the invention of the printing press, the entire classical canon had been reprinted and widely promulgated throughout Europe (Eisenstein, 1969; 52). More people had access to knowledge both new and old, more people could discuss these works. Book production became more commercialised, and the first copyright laws were passed. On the other hand, the printing press was criticized for allowing the dissemination of information that may have been incorrect.

A second outgrowth of this popularization of knowledge was the decline of Latin as the language of most published works, to be replaced by the vernacular language of each area, increasing the variety of published works. The printed word also helped to unify and standardize the spelling and syntax of these vernaculars, in effect 'decreasing' their variability. This rise in importance of national languages as opposed to pan-European Latin is cited as one of the causes of the rise of nationalism in Europe.

A third consequence of popularization of printing was on the economy. The printing press was associated with higher levels of city growth. The publication of trade-related manuals and books teaching techniques like double-entry bookkeeping increased the reliability of trade and led to the decline of merchant guilds and the rise of individual traders.

Industrial printing presses 

At the dawn of the Industrial Revolution, the mechanics of the hand-operated Gutenberg-style press were still essentially unchanged, although new materials in its construction, amongst other innovations, had gradually improved its printing efficiency. By 1800, Lord Stanhope had built a press completely from cast iron which reduced the force required by 90%, while doubling the size of the printed area. With a capacity of 480 pages per hour, the Stanhope press doubled the output of the old style press. Nonetheless, the limitations inherent to the traditional method of printing became obvious.

Two ideas altered the design of the printing press radically: First, the use of steam power for running the machinery, and second the replacement of the printing flatbed with the rotary motion of cylinders. Both elements were for the first time successfully implemented by the German printer Friedrich Koenig in a series of press designs devised between 1802 and 1818. Having moved to London in 1804, Koenig soon met Thomas Bensley and secured financial support for his project in 1807. Patented in 1810, Koenig had designed a steam press "much like a hand press connected to a steam engine." The first production trial of this model occurred in April 1811. He produced his machine with assistance from German engineer Andreas Friedrich Bauer.

Koenig and Bauer sold two of their first models to The Times in London in 1814, capable of 1,100 impressions per hour. The first edition so printed was on 28 November 1814. They went on to perfect the early model so that it could print on both sides of a sheet at once. This began the long process of making newspapers available to a mass audience (which in turn helped spread literacy), and from the 1820s changed the nature of book production, forcing a greater standardization in titles and other metadata. Their company Koenig & Bauer AG is still one of the world's largest manufacturers of printing presses today.

Rotary press
The steam-powered rotary printing press, invented in 1843 in the United States by Richard M. Hoe, ultimately allowed millions of copies of a page in a single day. Mass production of printed works flourished after the transition to rolled paper, as continuous feed allowed the presses to run at a much faster pace. Hoe's original design operated at up to 2,000 revolutions per hour where each revolution deposited 4 page images, giving the press a throughput of 8,000 pages per hour. By 1891, The New York World and Philadelphia Item were operating presses producing either 90,000 4-page sheets per hour or 48,000 8-page sheets.

Also, in the middle of the 19th century, there was a separate development of jobbing presses, small presses capable of printing small-format pieces such as billheads, letterheads, business cards, and envelopes. Jobbing presses were capable of quick setup (average setup time for a small job was under 15 minutes) and quick production (even on treadle-powered jobbing presses it was considered normal to get 1,000 impressions per hour [iph] with one pressman, with speeds of 1,500 iph often attained on simple envelope work). Job printing emerged as a reasonably cost-effective duplicating solution for commerce at this time.

Printing capacity 
The table lists the maximum number of pages which the various press designs could print per hour.

Gallery

See also 

 General
 Early American publishers and printers
 Imprimatur
 Printing
 Typography

 Printing presses
 Adana Printing Presses
 Albion press
 Columbian Printing Press
 Flexography
 Vertical print press
 Other inventions
 Color printing
 Composing stick
 Computer printer
 Desktop publishing
 Electronic publishing
 Lithography
 Offset printing

Notes

Bibliography 
On the effects of the printing press
  (Google book)
 
 
 
 
  [More recent, abridged version]
 
 
 
 

Technology of printing
 
 
 
 
 
 
 
 
 
 Ch'on Hye-bong: "Typography in Korea", Koreana, Vol. 7, No. 2 (1993), pp. 10–19
 
 
 
 
 
 
 
 
 Hind, Arthur M., An Introduction to a History of Woodcut, Houghton Mifflin Co. 1935 (in USA), reprinted Dover Publications, 1963 
 
 
 
 
 
 
 
 
 Needham, Joseph: "Science and Civilisation in China", Physics and Physical Technology (Vol. 4), Mechanical Engineering (Part 2), Cambridge University Press, 1965
 
 Encyclopædia Britannica 2006: "Printing". Retrieved 27 November 2006

External links 

 Centre for the History of the Book
 Gutenberg printing − Photos of Incunabula and the Gutenberg Bible (1455)
 Internet Archive: Printing (1947) − a film from the Prelinger Archives explaining the printing industry

Printing
Johannes Gutenberg
1445 introductions
Textual scholarship
15th-century inventions
German inventions